The Frutz is a river of Vorarlberg, Austria, a tributary of the Rhine.

Its source is in the Frutz Alpine shieling. It flows in western direction through the valley  in the area of Feldkirch to the Rhine. At Rankweil, the river divides into a side and main arm. The smaller one has an own name called . Both arms discharge separately at Koblach into the Rhine.

Bigger locations at the Frutz are Sulz, Rankweil and Koblach.

Rivers of Vorarlberg
Bregenz Forest Mountains
Rivers of Austria